Imamzadeh Hamzah, Kashmar, the oldest mosque in Kashmar, includes the tomb of Hamza al-Hamza ibn Musa al-Kadhim, the garden and the public cemetery, and is as an Imamzadeh.

Sources 

Mosques in Iran
Safavid architecture
Buildings and structures in Kashmar
National works of Iran
Tourist attractions in Razavi Khorasan Province